During the 1991–92 English football season, Sunderland A.F.C. competed in the Football League Second Division.

Season summary
In the 1991–92 season, Sunderland subsequently struggled in the Second Division. However, in that season, the Black Cats embarked on a run leading to the FA Cup final, where they lost 2–0 to Liverpool, They had previously beaten Chelsea in a quarter-final replay. Smith had quit as manager during the season, and was replaced by his assistant Malcolm Crosby.

Final league table

Results
Sunderland's score comes first

Legend

Football League Second Division

FA Cup

League Cup

Players

First-team squad
Squad at end of season

Left club during season

References

Notes

Sunderland A.F.C. seasons
Sunderland